A Vidalia onion ( or ) is one of several varieties of sweet onion grown in a production area defined by law of the U.S. state of Georgia since 1986 and the United States Code of Federal Regulations (CFR). Varieties include the hybrid Yellow Granex, varieties of Granex parentage, and similar varieties as recommended by the Vidalia Onion Committee and approved by the U.S. Secretary of Agriculture.

The onions are named Vidalia because they were historically grown in the town of Vidalia, Georgia. The cultivation of Vidalia onions started in the early 1930s. The Granex and related varieties are sweeter than other onions, but the unusual sweetness of Vidalia onions is due to the low amount of sulfur in the soil in which Vidalia onions are grown.

The Vidalia onion was named Georgia's official state vegetable in 1990.

Legislation
Georgia's state legislature passed the "Vidalia Onion Act of 1986" which authorized a trademark for "Vidalia Onions" and limits the production area to the following counties of Georgia or certain subsets as defined by the state's Commissioner of Agriculture:

Thirteen counties: Appling, Bacon, Bulloch, Candler, Emanuel, Evans, Jeff Davis, Montgomery, Tattnall,  Telfair, Toombs, Treutlen, and Wheeler.
Portions of seven counties: Dodge, Jenkins, Laurens, Long, Pierce, Screven, and Wayne.

Since Georgia statutes have no legally-binding effect outside Georgia, producers and handlers of Vidalia onions, meeting the standards defined by Georgia law, requested, and the United States Department of Agriculture promulgated, a Federal Marketing Order which defined the production area as a matter of United States federal law.

Further reading

External links
 Vidalia Onion Committee official website
 History of the Vidalia Onion
 Vidalia Onions in the New Georgia Encyclopedia
 Marketing Order 955: Vidalia Onions Grown In Georgia
 The Story of Vidalia Onion

References

Cuisine of the Southern United States
Flora of Georgia (U.S. state)
Onion cultivars
Symbols of Georgia (U.S. state)